Thomas Jefferson Dowd (April 20, 1869 – July 2, 1933), nicknamed "Buttermilk Tommy", was an American Major League Baseball outfielder and second baseman from Holyoke, Massachusetts, who played for six teams during his ten-season career.

College
Dowd played college baseball at Brown University, and according to an article in the Brown Alumni Magazine:

Nineteenth-century baseball authority Tim Murnane of the Boston Globe proclaimed Dowd the best center fielder he'd ever seen, especially for his skill at sprinting back on a ball over his head and then turning left or right for the catch. For years Dowd held the unofficial record time for circling the bases.

Major Leagues
Dowd made his major-league debut on April 8, 1891 for the Boston Reds of the American Association. He later played with the Washington Senators, St. Louis Browns, Philadelphia Phillies and Cleveland Spiders in the National League and the Boston Americans in the American League. He was a right-handed batter with a career batting average of .271, and stole 366 bases in his major league career. His final game was September 28, 1901. Dowd has the distinction of being the first Massachusetts native to play for the Americans, as well as the first official player, as he was the leadoff hitter in their first game, a road game in Baltimore.

During the 1891 and 1892 off-seasons, Dowd was the head football coach at Georgetown University.

Coaching career
After his career, he coached at Amherst College and Williams College, and managed in several minor and independent leagues. In 1908 he was managing at Hartford, and signed Chick Evans to a contract. Dowd also studied law at Georgetown University. He was given credit for discovering Rabbit Maranville.

In 1905, Dowd coached the football team at St. Louis University, leading the Blue and White to a 7–2 record.

Dowd died at the age of 64 in his hometown of Holyoke of accidental drowning. His body was found in the Connecticut River.  He is interred at the Calvary Cemetery.

Head coaching record

College football

See also

 List of Major League Baseball career stolen bases leaders
 List of Major League Baseball players to hit for the cycle
 List of Major League Baseball player-managers
 List of St. Louis Cardinals team records

References

Further reading

External links
, or Retrosheet
 

1869 births
1933 deaths
Major League Baseball center fielders
Boston Americans players
Boston Reds (AA) players
Cleveland Spiders players
Philadelphia Phillies players
St. Louis Browns (NL) players
St. Louis Browns (NL) managers
Washington Senators (1901–1960) players
Washington Statesmen players
Deaths by drowning in the United States
Accidental deaths in Massachusetts
19th-century baseball players
Baseball players from Massachusetts
Minor league baseball managers
Worcester Grays players
Amsterdam-Gloversville-Johnstown Jags players
Baltimore Orioles (IL) players
Nashua (minor league baseball) players
New Orleans Pelicans (baseball) players
Holyoke Paperweights players
Brown Bears baseball players
Georgetown Hoyas football coaches
Saint Louis Billikens football coaches
Major League Baseball player-managers
Amherst Mammoths baseball coaches
Williams Ephs baseball coaches
New Bedford Whalers (baseball) players